Kahmari Montgomery (born August 16, 1997) is an American track and field sprinter specializing in the 400 m for Nike. He was the men's 400 m champion at the USA Championships in 2018, and at the NCAA Division I Championships in 2019. He represented the United States in the  relay at the World U20 Championships in 2016 and at the inaugural Athletics World Cup in 2018, earning gold medals in both competitions.

In early 2018 he ran a 43.38 s  relay split, one of the fastest of all time, setting a school record and bringing the Houston Cougars to their first victory in the event at the Penn Relays. In February 2019 he ran a 44.45 s indoor split, the third-fastest indoor split of all time, to help the Houston Cougars to what is recognized as the world record for the indoor  relay with a time of 3:01.51.

Prep
Kahmari Montgomery competed for Plainfield Central High School. He ran the fifth-fastest 400 m in the United States for high school seniors in 2015. He was also No. 12 for the indoor 60 m, No. 14 for the 100 m, and No. 17 for the 200 m. Montgomery won five Illinois High School Association state track championship titles: the 100 m state title in 2015, the 200 m in 2014 and 2015, and the 400 m in 2014 and 2015.

College
As a freshman competing for the Missouri Tigers in 2016, Kahmari Montgomery won the indoor 400 m in 45.78 s and outdoor 400 m in 45.13 s to become a two time Southeastern Conference (SEC) champion. He made the semi-finals at both the indoor and outdoor NCAA Division I Championships, placing 11th and 9th respectively in the 400 m, and earned a silver medal at the USA Junior Championships. He competed at the USA Olympic Trials in the 400 m, though he did not advance from the preliminaries. He finished his season by earning a gold medal for the United States at the World U20 Championships in the 4 × 400 m relay.

In his sophomore season he had less success. He failed to reach the finals in either of the SEC Championships, failed to qualify for either of the NCAA Division I Championships, and did not approach his personal best times he had set in the prior year. However he represented the United States at the Universiade where he was introduced to Leroy Burrell, head coach of the Houston Cougars, and earned a silver medal in the 4 × 400 m relay. He decided to transfer to the University of Houston after his season ended, citing a positive experience with the team at the Universiade and a lack of belief in his ability to succeed as an athlete at the University of Missouri.

In his first year competing for the Houston Cougars in 2018, Kahmari Montgomery won the indoor 400 m in 45.53 s, indoor 4 × 400 m in 3:10.03, and outdoor 400 m in 45.93 s to become a three time American Athletic Conference (AAC) champion. At the Penn Relays he ran one of the fastest 4 × 400 m relay splits ever, clocking the anchor leg in 43.38 s and helping earn the Houston Cougars their first Penn Relays 4 × 400 m relay title in a new school record time of 3:01.82. He made the finals at both the indoor and outdoor NCAA Division I Championships, placing 4th and 7th respectively. In his last individual race for the season at the USA Championships he won the 400 m in a personal best time of 44.58 s. He went on to compete for the United States at the inaugural Athletics World Cup and the NACAC Championships, earning gold medals at both competitions in the 4 × 400 m relay.

At the beginning of 2019 Montgomery was placed on the preseason watch list for The Bowerman. In February at the Clemson Tiger Paw Invitational he anchored Houston to victory in the  relay with a world leading 3:01.51, the fourth fastest indoor performance of all time, and an indoor world record pending ratification. While not the fastest time achieved over the distance indoors, other faster times had not been ratified for various technical reasons. On February 26, 2020, Houston's indoor world record was ratified by World Athletics. Montgomery himself split 44.45 s, the third fastest indoor 400 m split of all time, to barely finish ahead of Texas A&M Aggie Devin Dixon, who recorded the fastest 400 m split of all time in 44.24 s. Two weeks later at the AAC Indoor Championships Montgomery repeated as 400 m champion with a world leading 45.04 s clocking. After the regional championships he was named co-athlete of the year by the United States Track & Field and Cross Country Coaches Association in the south-central region, shared with Devin Dixon. He wrapped up his indoor season with second place in the 400 m at the NCAA Division I Indoor Championships in 45.03 s, a new indoor personal best, and the 4 × 400 m relay title.

Statistics
Information from World Athletics profile unless otherwise noted.

Personal bests

International championships results

Circuit wins
Diamond League (400 m)
Doha: 2020

National championships results

NCAA results from Track & Field Results Reporting System.

Seasonal bests

Notes

References

External links

 (Houston)
 (Missouri)
Kahmari Montgomery bio at Houston Cougars

1997 births
Living people
African-American male track and field athletes
American male sprinters
Track and field athletes from Chicago
People from Plainfield, Illinois
Houston Cougars men's track and field athletes
University of Houston alumni
Universiade silver medalists for the United States
World Athletics indoor record holders (relay)
USA Outdoor Track and Field Championships winners
Universiade medalists in athletics (track and field)
Medalists at the 2017 Summer Universiade
21st-century African-American sportspeople